Krasteva is a surname. Notable people with the surname include:

 Beloslava Krasteva (born 2004), Bulgarian chess master
 Monika Krasteva (born 1999), Bulgarian volleyball player
 Nadia Krasteva, Bulgarian mezzo-soprano
 Neva Krasteva (born 1946), Bulgarian organist, musicologist, and composer
 Veneta Krasteva (born 1991), Bulgarian model, beauty expert, and beauty pageant title holder